Bartolomé Island is a volcanic islet in the Galápagos Islands group, just off the east coast of Santiago Island. It is one of the "younger" islands in the Galápagos archipelago. This island, and Sulivan Bay on Santiago island, are named after naturalist and lifelong friend of Charles Darwin, Sir Bartholomew James Sulivan, who was a lieutenant aboard HMS Beagle.

With a total land area of just , this island offers some of the most beautiful landscapes in the archipelago. The island consists of an extinct volcano and a variety of red, orange, green, and glistening black volcanic formations.

Bartolomé has a volcanic cone that is easy to climb and provides great views of the other islands.  Bartolomé is famous for its Pinnacle Rock, which is a distinctive characteristic of this island.

It has two visitor sites. At the first one, one may swim and snorkel around Pinnacle Rock; the underwater world there is really impressive. Snorkelers are in the water with the penguins, marine turtles, white-tipped reef sharks, and other tropical fish. The bay is also an excellent place to go swimming. The twin bays are separated by a narrow isthmus.

Galápagos penguins are frequently seen, and a small cave behind Pinnacle Rock houses a breeding colony.
Seasonally, Bartolomé is the mating and nesting site for the green turtles. With herons, they make use of the gentler beaches. 
The Galápagos lava cacti colonize the new lava fields.

Gallery

References

External links 
 Galapagosonline.com Bartolome information

Islands of the Galápagos Islands
Penguin colonies
Volcanoes of Ecuador
Volcanoes of the Galápagos Islands